The Córas Iompair Éireann 301 Class locomotives were the first diesel locomotives used on the CIÉ network, this class of 5 being built between 1947 and 1948 by the company for shunting use, particularly in the railway yards on Dublin's North Wall. Unusually, they lacked train vacuum brakes, although air brakes were provided for the locomotive itself.

They were initially numbered 1000-1004 in the steam locomotive number series, but were subsequently renumbered D301-D305 in order. The locomotives were used on yard pilot and transfer freight duties, although number 1000 hauled a freight train from Dublin to Cork during trials.  Two locomotives were stored from 1960 and the rest had followed by 1972, though officially they remained in stock until 1976. All five were scrapped in 1977.

Model 
The D Class is not available in either RTR or kit form.  However, the British Rail Class 08 can be used as a close approximation.

Footnotes

References

External links 
 Eiretrains - Irish Locomotives

Iarnród Éireann locomotives
C locomotives
Railway locomotives introduced in 1947
5 ft 3 in gauge locomotives
Diesel-electric locomotives of Ireland
Scrapped locomotives